Hayford Peak, elevation , is the highest mountain in the Sheep Range of Clark County, Nevada, United States. It is the seventh-most topographically prominent peak in the state.  The nearest taller mountain is Mount Charleston,  to the southwest. In the winter months, there is snow on the peak, which usually lasts until early spring.

See also
 List of Ultras of the United States
 Desert National Wildlife Refuge
 Hidden Forest Cabin

References

External links
 

Mountains of Nevada
Mountains of the Great Basin
Mountains of Clark County, Nevada